Sunriver is a census-designated place and  planned residential and resort community in Deschutes County, Oregon, United States. As of the 2010 census it had a population of 1,393.

Sunriver consists of residential homesites and common areas, recreational facilities, the Sunriver Resort and a commercial development known as The Village at Sunriver.

The Sunriver Resort Lodge has hotel rooms, banquet facilities, a fine-dining restaurant, and other amenities. Sunriver Resort manages four golf courses. Two are public (Meadows and Woodlands) and two are private (Caldera and Crosswater, available to guests staying at the resort). Sunriver also features the SHARC (Sunriver Homeowners Aquatic and Recreation Center), completed in 2012.

Demographics

History
Sunriver is located on the grounds of the former Camp Abbot, a World War II training facility designed to train combat engineers in a simulated combat environment. The U.S. Army camp opened in 1942, but by June 1944 the camp was abandoned and most of the settlement was razed.

The Officers' Club was spared; it has been preserved and renovated and is now known as the "Great Hall," under management of Sunriver Resort. The name "Sunriver" was selected by developers John Gray and Donald V. McCallum. The initial condominiums were built in 1968 in conjunction with the completion of Sunriver Lodge, and in 1969 the master plan was completed and developers began selling lots.

Sunriver was also the site of the pioneer Shonquest Ranch. Sunriver post office was established on July 18, 1969, at the same time as the public facilities were opened.

During the filming of Rooster Cogburn in autumn 1974, both of its 67-year-old stars, John Wayne and Katharine Hepburn, stayed at private homes  Governor Tom McCall flew in for a brief visit with them in

Climate
This region experiences warm (but not hot) and dry summers, with no average monthly temperatures above .  According to the Köppen Climate Classification system, Sunriver has a warm-summer Mediterranean climate, abbreviated "Csb" on climate maps.

See also
Sunriver Airport
Sunriver Observatory

References

External links

Sunriver Owners Association
Sunriver Service District
The Village at Sunriver

Planned communities in the United States
Unincorporated communities in Deschutes County, Oregon
Census-designated places in Oregon
1968 establishments in Oregon
Unincorporated communities in Oregon